The 1985 Arizona State Sun Devils football team was an American football team that represented Arizona State University in the Pacific-10 Conference (Pac-10) during the 1985 NCAA Division I-A football season. In their first season under head coach John Cooper, the Sun Devils compiled an 8–4 record (5–2 against Pac-10 opponents), finished in a tie for second place in the Pac-10, and outscored their opponents by a combined total of 285 to 168.

The team's statistical leaders included Jeff Van Raaphorst with 2,200 passing yards, Mike Crawford with 684 rushing yards, Aaron Cox with 788 receiving yards.

Schedule

References

Arizona State
Arizona State Sun Devils football seasons
Arizona State Sun Devils football